The third All-Africa Games were held in July 1978 in Algiers, Algeria.

New events were added to the athletics program; Decathlon and pentathlon, for men and women respectively, as well as men's 20 km road walk. Three nations also won their first medals at these championships these being Tunisia, Sudan and Upper Volta.

Malian discus thrower Namakoro Niaré won his third title, being the only athlete to do so. Four athletes, two male and two female, won more than one event:

El Kashief Hassan, Sudan (200 metres and 400 metres)
Hannah Afriyie, Ghana (100 metres and 200 metres)
Charlton Ehizuelen, Nigeria (long jump and triple jump)
Modupe Oshikoya, Nigeria (high jump and long jump)
 Nagui Asaad, Egypt, won his second Gold  medal in Shot Put of the All Africa Games in 1978, Algeria, after his first in 1973, All-Africa Games Algeria Nigeria.

Medal summary

Men's events

Women's events

Medal table

References
GBR All-Africa Games. GBR Athletics. Retrieved 2018-03-31.

1978
Athletics
All-Africa Games
1978 All-Africa Games